The Incurable Tragedy is the fifth full-length studio album by Canadian progressive death metal band Into Eternity. The album was released on August 25, 2008, in Europe through Century Media Records. This is the first album which does not feature longtime drummer Jim Austin, and the first to feature new drummer Steve Bolognese (although Steve toured with Into Eternity during the tour supporting Scattering of Ashes and appeared in the "Timeless Winter" video from the same album), and guitarist Justin Bender.

According to the band's site, the album is a concept album focusing on the struggles of a man who is diagnosed with a terminal illness, specifically cancer. The concept was inspired by the deaths of the two best friends and father of guitarist Tim Roth.

The first single off the album is "Time Immemorial", and the music video for the song was released on the band's MySpace page on December 10, 2008.

Critical reception

In its first week of release, the album sold 1,900 copies in the United States.

Track listing
 All songs written by Into Eternity
 All lyrics written by Tim Roth and Stu Block

Personnel
Credits are adapted from the album's liner notes. 

Into Eternity
 Stu Block − lead clean/death vocals
 Tim Roth − clean vocals/guitar
 Troy Bleich − bass
 Steve Bolognese − drums
 Justin Bender − guitar

Production and other
 Recorded, mixed & mastered at Touchwood Studios, Regina, SK
 Produced and engineered by Grant Hall and John Gasparic
 Mixed and mastered by Grant Hall
 Mixing assistant: Justin Bender
 Additional Pro Tools editing: Tyler Kuntz and Justin Bender
 Artwork: Mattias Norén, 
 Band photos: Cortney Bodnar − Light Artist Photography,

References

External links
 Into Eternity - Official News Page
 Century Music Audio Studios

2008 albums
Into Eternity (band) albums
Century Media Records albums
Concept albums